Groapele may refer to:

 Groapele, a tributary of the river Sebeș in Brașov County
 Groapele, a tributary of the river Văsălat in Argeș County

See also 
 Groapa (disambiguation)